Statistics of the 1989–90 Saudi First Division.

External links 
 Saudi Arabia Football Federation
 Saudi League Statistics
 Al Jazirah 21 Feb 1990 issue 6355 

Saudi First Division League seasons
Saudi Professional League
2